Karl-Heinz Hubler (born 28 November 1928) is a Swiss former middle-distance runner. He competed in the men's 1500 metres at the 1948 Summer Olympics.

References

External links
 

1928 births
Possibly living people
Athletes (track and field) at the 1948 Summer Olympics
Swiss male middle-distance runners
Olympic athletes of Switzerland
Place of birth missing